The Copa El Gráfico-Perú, was an international exhibition football competition hosted in  Peru since 1999 until 2006. It features teams from Peru, Chile, Argentina and Uruguay. All matches are played at the Estadio Nacional in Lima.

Champions

Titles by club

1999 Copa El Gráfico-Perú

2000 Copa El Gráfico-Perú

2001 Copa El Gráfico-Perú

2002-I Copa El Gráfico-Perú

2002-II Copa El Gráfico-Perú

2003 Copa El Gráfico-Perú

2004 Copa El Gráfico-Perú

2005 Copa El Gráfico-Perú

2006 Copa El Gráfico-Perú

Semifinals

Third Place

Final

References

 

Peruvian football friendly trophies